Åkre is a village in Rendalen Municipality in Innlandet county, Norway. The village is located just north of Åkrestrømmen, near the southern end of the lake Lomnessjøen. The road leads to Koppang and if you drive the other way it leads to Tynset via the villages of Otnes and Bergset.

References

Rendalen
Villages in Innlandet